"Out of the Chute" is the sixteenth episode of the seventh season of the American medical drama House. It aired on March 14, 2011.

Plot 
Newly single and back on Vicodin, House checks into a hotel for the five-star treatment, leaving his team to diagnose a professional bull-rider (Chad Faust) who was attacked by a bull after suffering a seizure. House admits to Wilson that he is taking Vicodin again, and that he needs help - but he insists that prostitutes will help him more than counselling. He proceeds to check in with the team telephonically while in the company of a variety of women. As the episode progresses, House continues to seek more and more thrills, which worries Wilson so he offers that House should move back in with him, which House declines. Wilson asks Cuddy to talk to House, but she refuses.

Diagnosing the bull-rider is difficult due to his various previous injuries which renders MRI technology and other diagnostics irrelevant. House instructs the team to do more and more aggressive tests with high risk to the patient: an MRI test despite the metal rod in his ribcage, which causes the metal to superheat; removing the plate in his skull to do a CT scan; and finally forcing his aortic valve to rupture during surgery to identify a weak spot in the valve in time to repair it. When the patient wakes up after surgery, Masters asks him out, having been attracted to him for most of the diagnostic process. The patient is embarrassed and does not respond.

At the end of the episode, House takes more Vicodin and then jumps from the balcony of his hotel room into the pool to do a cannonball while Wilson watches in shock.

Reception
Television Without Pity gave the episode a C. The A.V. Club gave it a B+.

References

External links
 "Out of the Chute" at Fox.com
 

House (season 7) episodes
2011 American television episodes